Eucratoscelus constrictus is a species of tarantula belonging to the family Theraphosidae. They produce a venom that contains a group of neurotoxic peptides.

References

External links
Taxonomy at ZipcodeZoo
Encyclopedia of Life
Profile
Genus profile
Animal Diversity Web
ITIS Report

Theraphosidae
Spiders of Africa
Spiders described in 1873